Following are the results of the 1977 Cronulla-Sutherland Sharks season.  The Cronulla-Sutherland Sharks are Australian professional Rugby league team based in Cronulla, in the Sutherland Shire, Southern Sydney, New South Wales. They compete in the National Rugby League (NRL), Australasia's premier Rugby league competition.

This was the 11th season in the club's history. They competed in the NSWRFL's 1977 Premiership as well as the 1977 Amco Cup.

Ladder

References

Cronulla-Sutherland Sharks seasons
Cronulla-Sutherland Sharks season